Samuel or Sam Campbell may refer to:

Samuel Campbell (American politician) (1773–1853), U.S. Representative from New York
Samuel Campbell (Canadian politician) (1788–1851), politician from Nova Scotia
Samuel Campbell (doctor), HMS Plumper ship's surgeon, 1857–1861; namesake of several locations in Canada
Samuel Campbell (New York state senator) (1809–1885), New York politician
Samuel B. Campbell (1846–1917), Republican politician in the state of Ohio
Samuel James Campbell, businessman from Mount Carroll, Illinois
Sam Campbell (writer) (1895–1962), writer, lecturer, and photographer
Sam Campbell (baseball), 19th-century baseball player
Sam Campbell (equestrian) (born 1944), Australian Olympic equestrian
Sam Campbell (footballer) (1892–1918), Australian rules footballer
Sam Campbell (comedian), Australian stand-up comedian and actor

In fiction
Samuel Campbell, a character from the television show Supernatural